The 1896 Cork Senior Football Championship was the 10th staging of the Cork Senior Football Championship since its establishment by the Cork County Board in 1887.

Fermoy were the defending champions.

Lees won the championship following a 0-03 to 0-00 defeat of Kanturk in the final at Cork Park. This was their third title overall and their first title since 1888.

Results

Final

Statistics

Miscellaneous

 Lees their first title since 1888.
 Kanturk qualify for the final for the final.

References

Cork Senior Football Championship